Pawnee Station is an unincorporated community in Bourbon County, Kansas, United States.

History
Pawnee Station was founded in 1871 when the railroad was extended to that point. The community took its name from Pawnee Creek. A post office was established at Pawnee Station in 1871, and remained in operation until 1945.

Further reading

References

External links
 Bourbon County maps: Current, Historic - KDOT

Unincorporated communities in Bourbon County, Kansas
Unincorporated communities in Kansas